David Cheng (born July 21, 1989) is an American sports car racing driver. He currently drives the No. 37 LMP2 Oreca 07 for Jackie Chan DC Racing in the Asian Le Mans Series and FIA World Endurance Championship.

Racing career
Born in Beijing, Cheng moved to the United States and was introduced to kart racing by a friend of his father; he had to do so in secret as his mother believed auto racing was too dangerous. In 2011, he moved up to sports cars, racing in the American Le Mans Series (ALMS) and the 24 Hours of Daytona. In the race, Cheng's team competed in the GT class, but the car suffered major damage before Cheng could drive; the team was able to overcome the damage to finish 21st. During the year, he also raced in China's Scirocco R Cup China, finishing seventh in points with a best finish of second at Sepang International Circuit's Merdeka Millennium Endurance Race. A year later, he split time between the Continental Tire SportsCar Challenge and Scirocco R Cup. In 2013, Cheng joined OAK Racing in the Asian Le Mans Series, driving for an all-Chinese stable alongside Ho-Pin Tung. At Sepang, he won the Sepang 12 Hours and was named one of ten Outstanding Youth by the Ministry of Foreign Affairs of the People's Republic of China. He also ran the ALMS' 12 Hours of Sebring and Petit Le Mans races, winning the former and claiming the Drivers' Championship for his co-driver in the latter by one point. Cheng and OAK ended the year by winning the LMP2 Asian Le Mans Team and Driver Championships. Cheng repeated the feat a season later.

For the 2015–16 Asian Le Mans Series season, Cheng formed DC Racing, racing a Ligier JS P3 with former OAK teammate Tung and Thomas Laurent. The team ended the season with the Team Championship and a guaranteed spot in the 2016 24 Hours of Le Mans.

In March 2015, Cheng met actor and martial artist Jackie Chan, who discussed his enjoyment of Steve McQueen's movie Le Mans as well as his interest in racing. After Cheng finished ninth in the LMP2 class at Le Mans that year, Chan raised the possibility of owning a team together for 2016, to which Cheng agreed. Together, the two entered DC Racing into the FIA World Endurance Championship under the Baxi DC Racing Alpine banner, partnering with Signatech Alpine and fielding Alpine A460s in the LMP2 class. In October, the team was rebranded as Jackie Chan DC Racing.

In 2017, Jackie Chan DC Racing allied with Jota Sport. At Le Mans, the team's No. 38 LMP2 took advantage of problems striking the LMP1 field to lead overall laps, becoming the first lower-class team to do so at Le Mans. The car went on to finish second overall and win the LMP2 class, while DC's No. 37 car, driven by Cheng, finished fourth overall, but Rebellion Racing's No. 13 was disqualified after failing post-race inspection and Cheng's No. 37 was promoted onto the podium. The No. 38's effort marked the first time a Chinese team won its class at Le Mans.

Racing record

Complete 24 Hours of Le Mans results

Complete FIA World Endurance Championship results
(key) (Races in bold indicate pole position; races in italics indicate fastest lap)

† As Cheng was a guest driver, he was ineligible to score points.
* Season still in progress.

Complete WeatherTech SportsCar Championship results
(key)(Races in bold indicate pole position, Results are overall/class)

References

External links
 
 

Living people
1989 births
Sportspeople from Beijing
American Le Mans Series drivers
Asian Le Mans Series drivers
24 Hours of Daytona drivers
24 Hours of Le Mans drivers
FIA World Endurance Championship drivers
U.S. F2000 National Championship drivers
OAK Racing drivers
Starworks Motorsport drivers
Jota Sport drivers